F.C. Kafr Yasif was an Arab-Israeli women's football club from Kafr Yasif, who competed in the Israeli Second Division, the Israeli Women's Cup and the second division league cup. The club existed for three seasons only before folding.

History
The club was established in 2011 and joined Ligat Nashim, entering in the second division. The club lost all of its matches in its first season, both in the league and in the cups. The next season the club won two league matches (one, against Bnot Caesarea Tiv'on, a walkover) and won a match in the second division league cup, advancing to the cup's semi-finals, where its lost 0–12 to F.C. Kiryat Gat. In its next season the club once again lost all of its matches, and folded at the end of the season.

External links
 F.C. Kafr Yasif Israeli Football Association 

Women's football clubs in Israel
Association football clubs established in 2011
Association football clubs disestablished in 2014
2011 establishments in Israel
2014 disestablishments in Israel
Northern District (Israel)